Ion Gavrilă Ogoranu (January 6, 1923 – May 1, 2006) was a member of the fascist paramilitary organization the Iron Guard, who between 1948 and 1955, after the Soviet occupation of Romania and the establishment of the Romanian People's Republic, became the leader of an underground far-right anti-communist paramilitary group in the Făgăraș Mountains.

Biography
Ogoranu was born in a Greek-Catholic Romanian family as one of three children, in Gura Văii, Făgăraș County, in the Țara Făgărașului region of southeastern Transylvania. He studied at Radu Negru High School in Făgăraș, where he was from 1936 to 1940 a member of the  "Negoiu" (The Brotherhood of the Cross), the youth wing of the Iron Guard. In 1940 he became the leader of the Frăția de Cruce organization in Făgăraș. In 1941 he was arrested by the Ion Antonescu regime for his participation in the Legionnaires' rebellion and was  condemned to 10 years forced labor. Released on April 19, 1944, he enrolled in the military school in Câmpulung.

After the end of World War II, Ogoranu attended classes at the Department of Agronomy, University of Cluj and the Commercial Academy in Brașov. He then became  involved in fascist and anti-communist activities in Cluj. For 7 years (1948–1955), he led the anti-communist resistance formation "Grupul Carpatin Făgărășan", consisting of 25–30 members active on the northern slopes of the Făgăraș Mountains. His group tried to establish contact with the resistance formations active on the southern side of the mountains, especially the groups led by Colonel Gheorghe Arsenescu and by Toma Arnăuțoiu, but those overtures were not met with success. For his activities, Ogoranu was sentenced in absentia to 19 years in prison and, later, in 1951, to death. In May 1954 he was wounded in a fight with the authorities. In 1955, the Securitate secret police killed or captured several members of his group, either through direct conflict or through denunciations. In 1957, the trial of those captured took place. Ion Chiujdea, Laurian Haṣu, Gheorghe Haṣu, Victor Metea, Nelu Novac, Ion Pop, Olimpiu Borzea, and Nicolae Burlacu were sentenced to death by firing squad; the last two had their sentences commuted to forced labor for life.

For 29 years, Ogoranu evaded capture by the Securitate. Most of the time he hid in Galtiu, a village in Sântimbru commune, Alba County. He stayed at the house of Ana Săbăduș, the widow of a political prisoner who died at Gherla Prison in 1952; she later became his wife. After 26 years on the run, the Securitate caught him in 1976 in Cluj, after luring him there with the help of an informer. He was interrogated for 6 months in Bucharest. He was reportedly spared execution at the direct intervention of U.S. President Richard Nixon. Released, he was employed as a worker, then as a technician at a collective state farm in Miercurea Sibiului.

On December 23, 1989, Ogoranu went to Bucharest, to participate in the  Romanian Revolution. Subsequently, he studied the  archives and worked on his 7-volume memoirs, titled "Fir trees break but do not bend". He died in Galtiu in 2006, and was buried in the village's cemetery; his wife died two months later.

Legacy
Ogoranu's life is the subject of the 2010 film, Portrait of the Fighter as a Young Man. At the 60th Berlin International Film Festival, the movie attracted protests from organizations such as the Elie Wiesel National Institute for Studying the Holocaust in Romania, which demanded that the film be pulled due to glorification of antisemitism. The Festival refused to pull it, arguing that they don't believe in censorship, but they are aware that Ogoranu made publicly "extremist, racist, and antidemocratic statements" and that they do not support such views, and that the movie did not support such views either.

Streets in Alba Iulia and Făgăraș are named after him.

Bibliography

References

See also
 

1923 births
2006 deaths
People from Brașov County
Romanian guerrillas
Romanian anti-communists
Romanian fascists
Members of the Romanian anti-communist resistance movement
Members of the Iron Guard
20th-century Romanian politicians
Romanian prisoners and detainees
Prisoners sentenced to death by Romania
Romanian prisoners sentenced to death
People sentenced to death in absentia
Romanian outlaws
Romanian male writers
Romanian non-fiction writers
Male non-fiction writers